Theodore Maynard (1890–1956) was an English poet, literary critic, and historian. He grew up in England until 1920, and afterwards he moved to America and lived there until his death. Although he considered himself primarily a poet, during his lifetime he was best known and most influential as a historian of Roman Catholicism, especially in the United States. Theodore Maynard is an uncle of writer Joyce Maynard.

Works

External links
 
 

1890 births
1956 deaths
20th-century British poets